Rafael Salgado Alves (born 4 January 1994) is a Portuguese footballer who plays as a goalkeeper for Trofense.

Club career
On 31 August 2021, he joined Trofense.

References

External links

Portuguese League profile 
National team data 

1994 births
Living people
Portuguese footballers
Association football goalkeepers
Primeira Liga players
Liga Portugal 2 players
Segunda Divisão players
Cypriot Second Division players
S.C. Braga B players
S.C. Braga players
C.F. União players
C.D. Aves players
F.C. Vizela players
PAEEK players
C.D. Trofense players
Portugal youth international footballers
Portuguese expatriate footballers
Expatriate footballers in Cyprus
Portuguese expatriate sportspeople in Cyprus